is a Japanese writer from Osaka. She has won numerous Japanese literary awards, including the Mystery Writers of Japan Award, the Japan Adventure Fiction Association Prize, the Naoki Prize, the Yomiuri Prize, and the Noma Literary Prize, and her work has been adapted for film and television.

Early life and education 
Takamura was born in Osaka in 1953. After graduating from International Christian University, she worked for a trading company, and did not start writing until her 30s.

Career 
Takamura's first novel, was published in 1990 and won the Japan Mystery and Suspense Grand Prize. Two years later her novel , a thriller about an Irish man mysteriously murdered in Tokyo as part of an apparent international espionage plot, was published, winning both the Mystery Writers of Japan Award and the Japan Adventure Fiction Association Prize. Ōgon o daite tobe was later adapted into the 2012 Kazuyuki Izutsu film of the same name, starring Satoshi Tsumabuki and Tadanobu Asano.

In 1993 Takamura's mystery novel , about a boy who survives his parents' suicide and grows up to be a psychopathic serial killer, won the Naoki Prize as well as Takamura's second consecutive Japan Adventure Fiction Association Prize. The book sold more than a million copies. It was later adapted into a 1995 Yoichi Sai film and a 2010 Wowow television drama. By the mid-1990s Takamura was seen as the "Queen of Mysteries", but in 1997, after completing a fictionalized account of the Glico Morinaga case titled , she changed the focus of her writing from mystery novels to literary fiction. Lady Joker was later adapted into the 2004 Hideyuki Hirayama film Lady Joker and a 2013 Wowow television drama.

Shin Ria-ō won the Shinran Prize, and Taiyō o hiku uma won the Yomiuri Prize. In 2016 she published the novel , about an elderly farmer coping with the death of his wife, alienation from his daughter, and disruption caused by the 2011 Tōhoku earthquake and tsunami. Tsuchi no ki won the 70th Noma Literary Prize, the 44th Jirō Osagari Prize, and a Mainichi Arts Award.

Writing style 
Takamura's fiction focuses especially on the psychological aspects of her characters. She also addresses larger contemporary social issues, both in her novels and in the nonfiction essays and commentary that she writes for newspapers and magazines.

Recognition 
 1992: 46th Mystery Writers of Japan Award
 1992: 11th Japan Adventure Fiction Association Prize
 1993: 109th Naoki Prize (1993上)
 1993: 12th Japan Adventure Fiction Association Prize
 2006: 4th Shinran Prize
 2009: 61st Yomiuri Prize
 2017: 70th Noma Literary Prize
 2017: 44th Jirō Osagari Prize
 2018: 59th Mainichi Arts Award

Film and other adaptations

Film 
 Marks no yama, 1995
 Lady Joker, 2004

Television 
 Marks no yama (Wowow, 2010)
 Lady Joker (Wowow, 2013)

Works 
 , 1990, Shinchosha, 
 , 1992, Shinchosha, 
 , 1993, Hayakawa Shobõ, 
 , 1997, Mainichi Shimbun, 
 , 2002, Shinchosha, 
 , 2005, Shinchosha, 
 , 2009, Shinchosha, 
 , 2016, Shinchosha,

References

Living people
1953 births
20th-century Japanese novelists
20th-century Japanese women writers
21st-century Japanese novelists
21st-century Japanese women writers
Japanese women novelists
Writers from Osaka
Naoki Prize winners
Yomiuri Prize winners